Bartonella silvatica is an oxidase- and catalase-negative bacterium from the genus Bartonella isolated from the blood of the large Japanese field mouse Apodemus speciosus.

References

External links
Type strain of Bartonella silvatica at BacDive -  the Bacterial Diversity Metadatabase

Bartonellaceae
Bacteria described in 2010